The 1906 East Denbighshire by-election was held on 14 August 1906.  The by-election was held due to the resignation of the incumbent Liberal MP, Samuel Moss, in order to become a county court judge.  It was won by the Liberal candidate Edward Hemmerde.

References

East Denbighshire by-election
1900s elections in Wales
History of Denbighshire
East Denbighshire by-election
East Denbighshire by-election
By-elections to the Parliament of the United Kingdom in Welsh constituencies